Raimundo Aguilera Solís (born 7 January 1949) is a retired football goalkeeper. He was a very skilled player, known for his agility and ball-handling, which helped him achieve the record of not conceding a goal in 1000 minutes twice during his career. Aguilera was known as the "Arquero de América" (goalkeeper of America).

Career
Aguilera started his career in the youth divisions of Club Guaraní and eventually made it to the first team in 1965 after starting goalkeeper Isidro Alonso got injured. He was part of the "golden era" of Club Guaraní in the 1960s, where the team won most of its 1st division championships (a total of three, Aguilera was part of two in 1967 and 1969). In 1971, he signed for Brazilian club Portuguesa and eventually transferred to Europe in 1975 where he played for Valencia CF. In 1976, he was back to Brazil to play for Botafogo before returning to Paraguay to play for Atletico Colegiales and retire.

Aguilera played for the Paraguay national football team a total of 11 times between 1967 and 1970.

Honours

Club
 Guaraní
 Paraguay 1st division: 1967, 1969
 Botafogo
 Taça Cidade de São Paulo: 1977

References

External links
 

1949 births
Living people
People from Itacurubí de la Cordillera
Association football goalkeepers
Paraguayan footballers
Paraguayan expatriate footballers
Club Guaraní players
Associação Portuguesa de Desportos players
Valencia CF players
Botafogo Futebol Clube (SP) players
Paraguay international footballers
Expatriate footballers in Brazil
Expatriate footballers in Spain
Paraguayan expatriate sportspeople in Brazil
Paraguayan expatriate sportspeople in Spain